|}

The Richmond Stakes is a Group 2 flat horse race in Great Britain open to two-year-old colts and geldings. It is run at Goodwood over a distance of 6 furlongs (1,207 metres), and it is scheduled to take place each year in late July or early August.

History
The event is named after the Duke of Richmond, one of the dukedoms held by the owner of Goodwood Racecourse. It was established in 1877, and it was originally open to horses of either gender. Six of the first eight winners were ridden by the jockey Fred Archer.

Several winners of the Richmond Stakes have gone on to win one or more of the following year's Classics. The most recent was Palestine, the winner of the 2000 Guineas in 1950.

The Richmond Stakes was restricted to male horses in 1989. It was sponsored by Diageo in promotion of the Tanqueray brand from 2010 and 2011, by Audi in 2012 and 2013, and by Qatar Bloodstock since 2014.

The race is currently held on the third day of the five-day Glorious Goodwood meeting.

Records
Leading jockey (6 wins):
 Fred Archer – Jannette (1877), Wheel of Fortune (1878), Bend Or (1879), Bal Gal (1880), Dutch Oven (1881), Rosy Morn (1884)
 Lester Piggott – Romantic (1962), Swing Easy (1970), Dragonara Palace (1973), J. O. Tobin (1976), Persian Bold (1977), Gallant Special (1982)

Leading trainer (5 wins):
 Mathew Dawson – Jannette (1877), Wheel of Fortune (1878), Bal Gal (1880), Dutch Oven (1881), Rosy Morn (1884)
 Richard Hannon Sr. – Son Pardo (1992), Prolific (2008), Dick Turpin (2009), Libranno (2010), Harbour Watch (2011)

Winners since 1975

Earlier winners

 1877: Jannette
 1878: Wheel of Fortune
 1879: Bend Or
 1880: Bal Gal
 1881: Dutch Oven
 1882: Sigmophone
 1883: Duke of Richmond
 1884: Rosy Morn
 1885: Sunrise
 1886: Panzerschiff
 1887: Friar's Balsam
 1888: Gulliver
 1889: Golden Gate
 1890: Siphonia
 1891: Orme
 1892: Inverdon
 1893: Galloping Dick
 1894: The Nipper
 1895: Persimmon
 1896: Chillingham
 1897: Paladore
 1898: St Gris
 1899: Winifreda
 1900: Handicapper
 1901: Duke of Westminster
 1902: Mead
 1903: Queen's Holiday
 1904: Polymelus
 1905: Lally
 1906: Weathercock
 1907: Bolted
 1908: Bayardo
 1909: Charles O'Malley
 1910: Pietri
 1911: Sweeper
 1912: Seremond
 1913: Black Jester
 1914: Pommern
 1915–18: no race
 1919: Golden Guinea
 1920: Sunblaze
 1921: Fodder
 1922: Bombay Duck
 1923: Halcyon
 1924: Manna
 1925: Pantera
 1926: The Satrap
 1927: Gang Warily
 1928: Rattlin the Reefer
 1929: Challenger
 1930: Four Course
 1931: Spenser
 1932: Solar Boy
 1933: Colombo
 1934: Bobsleigh
 1935: Mahmoud
 1936: Perifox
 1937: Unbreakable
 1938: Chancery
 1939: Moradabad
 1940–45: no race
 1946: Petition
 1947: Birthday Greetings
 1948: Star King *
 1949: Palestine
 1950: Grey Sovereign
 1951: Gay Time
 1952: Artane
 1953: The Pie King
 1954: Eubulides
 1955: Ratification
 1956: Red God
 1957: Promulgation
 1958: Hieroglyph
 1959: Dollar Piece
 1960: Typhoon
 1961: Sovereign Lord
 1962: Romantic
 1963: Gentle Art
 1964: Ragtime
 1965: Sky Gipsy
 1966: Hambleden
 1967: Berber
 1968: Tudor Music
 1969: Village Boy
 1970: Swing Easy
 1971: Sallust
 1972: Master Sing
 1973: Dragonara Palace
 1974: Legal Eagle

* The 1948 winner Star King was later exported to Australia and renamed Star Kingdom.

See also
 Horse racing in Great Britain
 List of British flat horse races

References
 Paris-Turf: 
 Racing Post:
 galopp-sieger.de – Richmond Stakes.
 ifhaonline.org – International Federation of Horseracing Authorities – Richmond Stakes (2019).
 pedigreequery.com – Richmond Stakes – Goodwood.
 

Flat races in Great Britain
Goodwood Racecourse
Flat horse races for two-year-olds
Recurring sporting events established in 1877
1877 establishments in England